A referendum on alcohol was held in Switzerland on 6 April 1930. Voters were asked whether they approved of amending articles 31 and 32 bis and adding article 32 quater, which concerned alcohol. The proposal was approved by a majority of voters and cantons.

Background
The referendum was a mandatory referendum, which required a double majority; a majority of the popular vote and majority of the cantons. The decision of each canton was based on the vote in that canton. Full cantons counted as one vote, whilst half cantons counted as half.

Results

References

1930 referendums
1930 in Switzerland
Referendums in Switzerland
Prohibition referendums